New Horn in Town is the sole album led by trumpeter Richard Williams featuring performances recorded in late 1960 and originally released on the Candid label.

Reception

Scott Yanow of Allmusic wrote: "Considering how well trumpeter Richard Williams plays on this session, it is hard to believe that this was the only record he ever led. ...a set of strong hard bop".

Track listing
All compositions by Richard Williams except as indicated
 "I Can Dream, Can't I?" (Sammy Fain, Irving Kahal) - 6:09
 "I Remember Clifford" (Benny Golson) - 6:18
 "Ferris Wheel" (Richard Wyands) - 4:48
 "Raucous Notes" - 4:43
 "Blues in a Quandary" - 4:31
 "Over the Rainbow" (Harold Arlen, E.Y. "Yip" Harburg) - 8:37
 "Renita's Bounce" - 5:21

Personnel
Richard Williams - trumpet
Leo Wright - alto saxophone, flute
Richard Wyands - piano
Reggie Workman - bass
Bobby Thomas - drums

References

Candid Records albums
Richard Williams (musician) albums
1960 albums
Albums produced by Nat Hentoff